Vegetarian is a 2009 South Korean erotic body horror drama film directed by Lim Woo-Seong based on the 2007 same-titled novel by Han Kang. The film debuted at the 14th Busan International Film Festival on October 8, 2009, and was later released in South Korea on February 18, 2010. In January 2010, it was invited to the World Cinema Narrative Competition at the 2010 Sundance Film Festival.

Justin Chang, writing for Variety, said, "Body horror and body art are conjoined in the tastefully kinky" film, which is a "tonally extreme portrait of a woman who swears off meat before retreating into a literally vegetative state". He felt that the film was "an audacious if borderline risible psychodrama".

Cast
 Chae Min-seo as Young-Hye 
 Kim Hyun-sung as Min-Ho
 Kim Yeo-jin as Ji-Hye

References

External links
  
 
 
 

2009 films
2000s erotic drama films
2000s Korean-language films
Films based on South Korean novels
South Korean erotic drama films
Anorexia nervosa
2009 drama films
Vegetarianism in fiction
2000s South Korean films